Bakhtawar Singh Thapa also spelled Bhaktawar, was a Nepalese military commander, politician, and governor. He acted as an aide of his brother Mukhtiyar Bhimsen Thapa and was appointed the commander of Samar Jung Company. He commanded the Bijayapur-Sindhuli Gadhi Axis in the first campaign of Anglo-Nepalese War and Makwanpur Gadhi Axis in the second campaign. Later, he became the governor of Palpa and died in the office.

Early life

Bakhtawar Singh Thapa was born to military officer Kaji Amar Singh Thapa (sanu) and Satyarupa Maya. He was the brother of Mukhtiyar Bhimsen Thapa and had other three brothers - Nain Singh Thapa, Amrit Singh Thapa, and Ranabir Singh Thapa. From his step-mother, he had two brothers—Ranbam and Ranzawar. His ancestors were members of Bagale Thapa clan from Jumla who migrated eastwards. His grandfather was Bir Bhadra Thapa, a courtier in Prithvi Narayan Shah's army.

Career

Commander of the Palace
After the Bhandarkhal Massacre of 1806, the Samar Jung Company was selected as royal palace guard by Mukhtiyar Bhimsen Thapa. Bakhtawar Singh was appointed as the commander of the company to be camped inside the palace for the protection of King Girvan Yuddha Bikram Shah and Queen Tripurasundari of Nepal. In the maturity of King Girvan Yuddha Bikram Shah and Queen Tripurasundari of Nepal, Kaji Bakhtawar slowly gained confidence out of both from his role of their protector. The death of King Girvan Yuddha Bikram Shah and his two queens in 1816 had caused his hopes to be destroyed. After the end of Anglo-Nepalese war, Kaji Bakhtawar was suspected by his brother Bhimsen Thapa to have joined the enemy factions. At the time, he was living in the same family with his brother without the division of their ancestral property. Bhimsen slowly brought Kaji Bakhtawar under his control but their mother pleaded only a light punishment for Bakhtawar. He was dismissed from his position and was imprisoned in the Nuwakot prison and the Bakhtawar's Samar Jung Company was heavily disfavored by the Mukhtiyar.

Anglo-Nepalese War
Bakhtawar was the commander of Bijaypur-Sindhuli Gadhi axis during the first campaign of the Anglo-Nepalese war. He was stationing the fort and the region by 2000 soldiers. In the second campaign, he was commanding his headquarter at Makwanpur Gadhi. He sent the final ratified document of Sugali Treaty to British India Company after the Hitaura camp of Major General David Ochterlony on 4 March 1816.

Governor of Palpa
A letter dated March 1824 to his brother Mukhtiyar Bhimsen Thapa shows Bakhtawar Singh as the governor of Palpa. Members of the Thapa dynasty were appointed as the governor of Palpa because it controlled over 4 battalions of the Nepalese Army. Bakhtawar Singh died in his office of Chief Administrator of Palpa in 1832 A.D.

Family

Son
His son Trivikram Singh Thapa became Acting Chief Administrator of Palpa in 1832 A.D. on death of his father. However, Bhimsen Thapa did not trust Trivikram Singh and instead appointed his brother Ranabir Singh Thapa as Chief Administrator of Palpa in March 1833. Trivikram Singh was affectionately referred as Kaji Mama ("Kaji Uncle") by the Shamsher Ranas. After the Kot Massacre, he occupied the Lazimpat Durbar for 28 years until he left for Varanasi in 1875.

Wife
The widow of Bakhtawar Singh on 1839 presented evidences against the former Mukhtiyar and her brother-in-law Bhimsen Thapa claiming the former Mukhtiyar responsible for poisoning of King Girvan Yuddha Bikram Shah, whom it was widely known to have died from smallpox.

References

Books

 

Year of birth missing
1832 deaths
Anglo-Nepalese War
Bagale Thapa
Gurkhas
Nepalese military personnel
People from Gorkha District